The  (720–721) was a rebellion of the Hayato of southern Kyushu against the Yamato dynasty of Japan during the Nara period. After a year and a half of fighting, the Hayato were defeated, and the Imperial court established its rule over southern Kyushu.

Background 

In the latter half of the 7th century, the Yamato court's influence extended to southern Kyushu, but the scattered Kumaso and Hayato populations held their ground. The court was attempting to introduce its own Ritsuryō system throughout its sphere of influence, but the populations of southern Kyushu resisted. This was because Ritsuryō was based on rice cultivation, to which the volcanic soil of southern Kyushu was unsuited.

On the other hand, the court was also expanding its intercourse with mainland China through the Ryukyu Islands.

The court gathered weapons in Dazaifu, and in 702 dispatched troops to southern Kyushu. At the same time, they established the future Satsuma Province there and strengthened the local governmental structure. In 713, Ōsumi Province was established, and 5,000 inhabitants of Buzen Province, where Ritsuryō had already been implemented, were sent to live there and guide the further adoption of Ritsuryō. Tensions rose as the court continued to press Ritsuryō, and especially the Handen-Shūju system, on the Hayato population, who practiced communal land use.

Rebellion 

Early in the year 720, the imperial court received notice from Dazaifu that , the governor of Ōsumi Province, had been killed.

The Hayato side gathered several thousand troops and holed up in seven castles. In response, the court gathered over ten thousand troops from the various regions of Kyushu and divided them into a two-pronged attack, advancing from the east and the west. Three months after the attack was launched, they reported the defeat of five of the castles. The war drew on, and after another two months, Ōtomo returned to the capital, leaving his vice-generals in charge.

After almost a year and a half of fighting, the war ended in the Hayatos' defeat. In mid-721, the vice-generals returned to the capital with Hayato prisoners of war. Between those killed and taken prisoner, the Shoku Nihongi records Hayato casualties totaling 1,400 people. Due to the rebellion, the enforcement of Handen-Shūju was postponed. It was finally implemented in 800, almost eighty years after the war.

The population of the Yamato in Kyushu increased. The Hayato eventually assimilated into Japanese society and many of them also moved to the main island of Honshū, especially the Kinai region, where they were active in the protection of the court, the arts, sumo, and bamboo work. Many lived in Yamashiro Province, in the south of modern Kyoto. There remains an area called  in Kyōtanabe, Kyoto, where many Ōsumi Hayato lived. These were the Hayato governed by the Hayato-shi, appointed by the Imperial dynasty.

References 

720
721
720s conflicts
8th-century rebellions
8th century in Japan
Nara period
Rebellions in Japan